The 1930 Pacific hurricane season ran through the summer and fall of 1930. Before the satellite age started in the 1960s, data on east Pacific hurricanes was extremely unreliable. Most east Pacific storms were of no threat to land.

Systems

Hurricane One
On June 4, a tropical cyclone formed south of the Gulf of Tehuantepec. It paralleled the coast, became a hurricane, and approached the coast. On June 11, it made landfall north of Mazatlán and dissipated inland. Some damage in Mazatlán was reported.

Tropical Cyclone Two
From August 18 to 20, a tropical cyclone existed in the waters west of Manzanillo.

Hurricane Three
On October 3, a tropical cyclone formed near the Revillagigedo Islands. It slowly moved northeasterly, became very intense, and made landfall north of Mazatlán on October 4 or October 5. Once inland, it greatly increased in speed, and dissipated October 7, while over Arkansas.

This hurricane hassled a number of ships. One of them needed to be repaired at a cost of $10,000 (1930 USD), and another had its cargo damaged.

Hurricane Four
On October 9, a tropical cyclone formed in the Gulf of Tehuantepec. Eventually becoming a hurricane, it moved up the coast as far as Acapulco. It was last seen on October 11.

This hurricane caused damage in Acapulco. Many buildings were demolished by the storm, and roads and telegraph lines were destroyed. Damage to property was heavy, but no one was killed or injured.

Hurricane Five
On October 16, a tropical cyclone existed somewhere between Acapulco and Cape Corrientes. It or its remnants managed to cross the Isthmus of Tehuantepec and enter the Bay of Campeche, where they dissipated on October 20.

See also

1930 Atlantic hurricane season
1930 Pacific typhoon season
1930s North Indian Ocean cyclone seasons
 1900–1940 South Pacific cyclone seasons
 1900–1950 South-West Indian Ocean cyclone seasons
 1930s Australian region cyclone seasons

References

1930 in Mexico
Pacific hurricane seasons
1930s Pacific hurricane seasons